Carl Decaluwé (born 18 September 1960) is a Belgian politician who has been the Governor of West Flanders since 2012. He is a member of Christen-Democratisch en Vlaams.

Early life 
Decaluwé was born in Kortrijk. He graduated from Ghent University.

Political career 
In 2012, he succeeded Paul Breyne as Governor of West Flanders Province.

In June 2020, Decaluwé announced the use of thermographic cameras to combat human trafficking and people smuggling along the North Sea coast.

References

External links 
 Official website

1960 births
Living people
Christian Democratic and Flemish politicians
People from West Flanders
Governors of West Flanders
People from Kortrijk
Ghent University alumni